Última Hora is the best selling newspaper in the Balearic Islands founded by Josep Tous Ferrer on 1 May 1893, published by Hora Nova S.A. and belong to Grupo Serra, a mass communication company. The publication is dedicated to local news and has been distinguished with the Gold Medal of the City of Palma  from the Confederación de Asociaciones Empresariales de las Baleares (CAEB).

Directors 
 Josep Tous Ferrer (1893-1950)
 Josep Tous Lladó (1950-1958)
 Ferran Tous Lladó (1958-1960)
 Josep Tous Barberán (1960-1974)
 Pere Antoni Serra Bauzà (1974-1983)
 Pere Comas Barceló (1984-2014)
 Miquel Serra Magraner (desde 2014)

Ideology 
Última Hora is a newspaper with a liberal tradition. During World War I, they took an editorial position in favor of the Anglophile countries. Their first era of publication was characterized by the support to the policy of Valerià Weyler and of the Liberal Weylerista Party.

During the Dictatorship of Primo de Rivera, the newspaper was censored and its sections most affected included reports on telegraph service, editorials and opinion pieces.

During the Second Republic, they took a more conservative editorial line and were critical of media with connections to the working class. In spite of this, in its pages published socialist leaders articles like Alexandre Jaume and Gabriel Alomar i Villalonga, and celebrated the proclamation of the new regime.

During the Dictatorship, the newspaper was subject to prior censorship and, in the late 1960s, accentuated its liberal tendency and position in favor of democracy. From 1974 until today, Última Hora has been characterized as a newspaper with a liberal autonomist tendency.

Editors and contributors 
 Joan Lluís Estelrich
 Pere d’Alcàntara Peña
 Miguel Sarmiento
 Alexandre Jaume
 Gabriel Alomar
 Pau Llull
 Antoni Serra
 Francesc de B. Moll
 Josep M. Llompart
 Gabriel Janer Manila
 Blai Bonet
 Damià Pons
 Guillem Frontera
 Josep Melià
 Maria de la Pau Janer
 Llorenç Capellà
 Baltasar Porcel
 Joan Francesc López Casasnoves

Digital edition 
In 1997, Grupo Serra decided to create a digital edition. A year later, they launched ultimahora.es .  They served as a national pioneer in Spain for online editions of newspapers. In 2010, their online version had a major redesign and their contents were modified.

References

Bibliography

External links 
  Última Hora
  Grupo Serra
1893 in Spain
Francoist Spain
Publications established in 1893
Second Spanish Republic